"5 Colours in Her Hair" is the debut single by English pop rock band McFly. It was also the band's first UK number one. It stayed at the top for two weeks. The song was written by Tom Fletcher, James Bourne, Danny Jones and Ben Sargeant. The track is especially well known for its "Doo, doo, doo, doo, doo, doo!" lyrics, played at the beginning and at the ending of the song. The CD and 7-inch formats features a duet with Busted singing a cover of the Kinks song "Lola".

Overall, it spent twelve weeks in the UK Singles Chart. It also reached number seven in Ireland. The song was inspired by Susan Lee, a character played by actress Emily Corrie in the TV series As If, who wore coloured dreadlocks. The music itself is indebted to 1960s surf and beat music. The song was also nominated for The Record of the Year in 2004, but finished in second place just one point behind the winner, "Thunderbirds / 3AM" by Busted.

Music video
McFly shot the video for their debut single "5 Colours in Her Hair" just after Christmas 2003. Simon Amstell recorded an interview and footage behind the scenes for Channel 4 music show, Popworld. The video begins by introducing the band members in a comical style, by getting Danny and Dougie's names wrong. It also features the band messing around at various different scenes, but telling the overall main story about a girl with 5 colours in her hair, who was miserable and living in a black and white world. She then follows them into the TV where she joins the band in a club setting where the band are playing to a crowd. They also shoot various well known scenes as a tribute to their main influences including the Beatles and the Beach Boys. The video was shot in front of a green screen. It stars Molly Portsmouth as the 'Girl with 5 Colours in Her Hair'.

US version
A rerecorded pop punk version of the song appeared on the Just My Luck album, McFly's debut album in the US. It also features minor lyrical alterations. The song was included on the "Please, Please" single release in the UK, as well as on the All the Greatest Hits deluxe fan edition. It would go on to be the default way they would perform the song live.

Track listings

Charts

Weekly charts

Year-end charts

Certifications

Cover versions
In 2014, a cover of the track featured on the release of the Vamps' second single "Wild Heart".

References

2004 debut singles
2004 songs
Island Records singles
McFly songs
Number-one singles in Scotland
Songs written by Danny Jones
Songs written by James Bourne
Songs written by Tom Fletcher
UK Singles Chart number-one singles
Universal Records singles